Henryk Borucz (10 May 1921 – 8 June 1984) was a Polish footballer. He played in five matches for the Poland national football team from 1949 to 1951.

References

External links
 

1921 births
1984 deaths
Polish footballers
Poland international footballers
Place of birth missing
Association football goalkeepers
Polonia Warsaw players